İşıqlı (also, Ishikhly and Ishygly) is a village in the Fuzuli District of Azerbaijan. It was occupied by Armenian forces during the Nagorno-Karabakh war, but was re-captured by Azerbaijan on 17 October 2020.

References 

Populated places in Fuzuli District